Thittakkudi is a village located near Pattukkottai town in Thanjavur district in the state of Tamil Nadu, India. The village is located at about 6 km north of Pattukkottai on Pattukkottai - Kumbakonam highway & 350 km South from the state capital, Chennai.

References

Villages in Thanjavur district